The Slovenian Catholic Church, or Catholic Church in Slovenia is part of the worldwide Catholic Church, under the spiritual leadership of the Pope in Rome. The 2018 Eurobarometer data shows 73.4% of Slovenian population identifying as Catholic that fell to 72.1% in the 2019 Eurobarometer survey. According to the Catholic Church data, the Catholic population fell from 78.04% in 2009 to 72.11% in 2019.

There are total of 1,509,986 (72.11%) Catholics in Slovenia in 2019 by official statistics published by Catholic Church of Slovenia. The country is divided into six dioceses, including two archdioceses. The diocese of Maribor was elevated to an archdiocese by Pope Benedict XVI in 2006. Additionally, the pope created three new sees, namely Novo Mesto, Celje and Murska Sobota.

Archbishop Jean-Marie Speich is the Apostolic Nuncio to Slovenia, the Titular Archbishop of Sulci and the Apostolic Delegate to Kosovo.

Timeline 
Catholics by years

Structure

Archdiocese of Ljubljana, Labacensis (1)
Diocese of Koper, (2)
Diocese of Novo Mesto (3)
Archdiocese of Maribor (4)
Diocese of Celje (5)
Diocese of Murska Sobota (6)

See also
Episcopal Conference of Slovenia
Greek Catholic Church of Croatia and Serbia (also covers Slovenia)
List of Slovenian cardinals
List of Slovenian Catholic bishops

References

External links
Official Website – Catholic Church in Slovenia 

 
Slovenia
Slovenia